, also known as , is a neighborhood in Shinjuku, Tokyo, Japan. The neighborhood is built around Shin-Ōkubo Station, accessible on the Yamanote Line, and is known for its extensive Korean community.   Shin-Ōkubo is home to both Korean residents in Japan as well as Korean immigrants, and has seen an upsurge in popularity due to  the Hallyu Korean pop-culture boom. In recent years the area has also attracted many Southeast Asian and Middle Eastern immigrants, with many international restaurants and stores opening up in the neighborhood as a result.

History
Shin Sang-yoon, the director of the Korean Chamber of Commerce and Industry in Japan, stated that Koreans began coming to Shin-Ōkubo around 1983 because at that time it was one of the most inexpensive areas of Tokyo. By July 2013 several nationalistic anti-Korean demonstrations done by right-wing Japanese have occurred in Shin-Ōkubo.

By 2018 restaurants of other ethnicities opened in Shin-Okubo; a concentration of them opened in "Muslim Town". There is also a "Little Chinatown".

Economy
As of July 2013, the Korean Chamber of Commerce and Industry in Japan stated that Shin-Ōkubo had 500 businesses, including around 350 restaurants.

References

Zainichi Korean culture
Shinjuku